Lovecraft's Book is a historical novel by American author Richard A. Lupoff.  It was released in 1985 by Arkham House in an edition of 3,544 copies.  It was the author's first book published by Arkham House.

Originally a 160,000-word manuscript, the published novel was a shorter popular re-write destined originally for mainstream publisher Putnam. When Putnam demanded even more re-writes, the Putnam version was sold to Arkham House and became Lovecraft's Book. The original 160,000-word manuscript was lost, but a carbon-copy was found in 2000 and the full original novel was published unabridged as Marblehead: A Novel of H. P. Lovecraft (2006).

Plot summary

The story concerns an offer made to the unworldly fantasist and ghost-writer H. P. Lovecraft by the canny fascist sympathizer, George Sylvester Viereck. Lovecraft is hired to write a political tract in the nature of an American Mein Kampf. In return, Viereck promises to arrange for the publication of a volume of Lovecraft's stories.

Sources

1985 American novels
American historical novels
Arkham House books
Works about H. P. Lovecraft